Quentin Dupieux (born 14 April 1974), also known by his musical stage name Mr. Oizo, is a French filmmaker, electronic musician, and DJ.

Dupieux is credited with his legal name for his films, while the name "Mr. Oizo" is used for his musical works.

Dupieux has directed numerous films including Rubber (2010), Wrong (2012), Wrong Cops (2013), and Reality (2014). After initially producing his films in the United States, he began making films in France in 2018. Since then, he has released Keep an Eye Out! (2018), Deerskin (2019), and Mandibles (2020) which have been entirely filmed and produced in France.

Under the pseudonym Mr. Oizo, he is best known for his 1999 single "Flat Beat". His pseudonym is a corruption of the French , meaning "bird". He is signed to F Communications, Ed Banger Records and Brainfeeder.

Early life
Quentin Dupieux was born on 14 April 1974 in Paris. At the age of 18, he found a camera and started taking photographs. At 19, he began to play music to illustrate his images, and he bought his first synthesizer. In 1997, Laurent Garnier of the record label FCom bought a car from Dupieux's father. Garnier then found out about his talents and let him direct the music video for his song "Flashback". Dupieux was subsequently signed to FCom, which released his first EP, #1.

Musical career

"Flat Beat"
Dupieux released "Flat Beat" in January 1999, a track consisting mainly of a repeated bass loop and a drum sample from "Put Your Love in My Tender Care" by The Fatback Band. In an interview with XLR8R magazine, Dupieux stated that it took him only two hours with a Korg MS-20 to produce. Flat Beat became a hit throughout Europe in 1999, becoming the best-known Mr. Oizo release. The track was featured in a series of Levi's jeans TV commercials, which featured a yellow puppet named Flat Eric nodding his head to the rhythm while riding in an old, beat-up Chevelle. Flat Eric was also featured in the song's music video. The Flat Beat EP has sold over three million copies. The song reached number 1 in the UK.

Analog Worms Attack
After "Flat Beat", Oizo spent two months creating his first full album, Analog Worms Attack, which was released in 1999. The album's name was derived from the fact that it was produced entirely using analog equipment. The record scratching effects were provided by Mr. Oizo's friend Feadz. "Flat Beat" appeared as a bonus track after the five minutes of silence following the final track "Analog Wormz Sequel". A total of three singles were released in support of the album. A version of "Monday Massacre" from the Flat Beat EP featuring sampled record scratching appears on the album, titled "No Day Massacre".

Moustache (Half a Scissor)
Moustache (Half a Scissor) was Mr. Oizo's second studio album. Released in 2005, the album was composed exclusively using computers as he had by that time decided to eschew the use of analog equipment. The extensive time it took to remodel his studio and master the use of computers in composing electronic music is cited as the reason for the long hiatus between Analog Worms Attack and Moustache (Half a Scissor). Before its public release, a promo CD was released onto the internet featuring three tracks not on the original release: "CPU", "Nazis", and "A Nun".

Some songs on the promo differ from the released album versions. For example, "Nurse Bob" is much longer on the final release whilst the promo version splices vocal samples into a much shorter version. This is the only Mr. Oizo album not to have its debut release on vinyl; a vinyl version would first be released in January 2011 through Brainfeeder.

Ed Banger Records

Mr. Oizo's first EP released on Ed Banger Records is called "Transexual / Patrick122". The EP features the track "Patrick122", which is a re-working of the 1979 disco track "Do It at the Disco" by Gary's Gang. The track appeared on Mr. Oizo's MySpace page in 2006 under the title Patrick122.

On 16 October 2008 his MySpace page had another video appear: a promo for his upcoming album, Lambs Anger. The first single off the Record was "Positif", which was released 3 days after Lambs Anger. On 15 March 2009 the second single off the album was released, "Pourriture", released as an EP featuring some reworked titles by Oizo himself and a remix of "Erreurjean" by Arveene and Misk.

Lambs Anger
Lambs Anger is Mr. Oizo's first studio album released by Ed Banger Records, the label he chose after his split with F Communications, who notoriously referred to Moustache (Half a Scissor) as "unlistenable". "Positif", "Two Takes It" (featuring Carmen Castro) and "Pourriture" were chosen as the album's singles. The track "Steroids" also features label-mate Uffie. "Two Takes It" is a cover of the song "It Takes Two" by Rob Base and DJ E-Z Rock and "Gay Dentists" contains samples of "Let's Start the Dance" by Hamilton Bohannon.

Collaborations with Uffie
Mr. Oizo and Uffie first collaborated on her second single, "Ready to Uff", in 2006. Since then he has produced the following tracks for Uffie: "Dismissed", "Hot Chick", "First Love" (which charted at number 18 in Belgium), "Steroids" and "MCs Can Kiss".

Mr. Oizo provided both production work and songwriting for Uffie's 2010 debut album, Sex Dreams and Denim Jeans. He worked alongside Feadz, SebastiAn, Mirwais, J-Mat and Uffie to produce and write the album. He produced the first single from the album, "MCs Can Kiss", which peaked at number 48 in Japan and 97 in France. He also produced the tracks "Art of Uff", "First Love", "Our Song" and "Neuneu".

The Church and All Wet
In 2014, Mr. Oizo released the album The Church, which contains 10 tracks, including a collaboration with Bart B More on the track "Dry Run". Unlike his previous album, The Church was released by Brainfeeder due to his activity in the United States at the time.

Two years later, he released the album All Wet on Ed Banger Records. The album contains collaborations with Boys Noize, Phra, Siriusmo, Mocky, Peaches, Charli XCX and Skrillex on the track "End of the World", the latter serving as the lead single for the album.

Production and equipment
In his early years, Mr. Oizo used a Korg MS-20, a Roland TR-606, an Akai S1000, and a demo of Cakewalk. Mr. Oizo is known currently for strong use of computers in his music. As he stated in an interview with XLR8R, he started using computers to avoid having to plug in four different appliances, and because the resulting music is more or less the same. His first album to switch to all computers was Moustache (Half a Scissor). For Lambs Anger, Mr. Oizo used a Macintosh G5 running Logic Pro to compose all of the songs. During his DJ sets, he uses two CDJs.

Filmmaking career

Dupieux created a number of music videos and feature films, starting with the 1997 music video "Kirk". He not only directs his productions, he is usually also writer, editor, composer and cinematographer.

Dupieux's films are highly surrealist in nature, and he has been compared to filmmakers such as Charlie Kaufmann and Luis Buñuel. The frequent use of dreams in his movies have also invited comparisons to director David Lynch, although Dupieux himself dislikes this comparison. His movies often consist of meta narratives: In the film Rubber, a group of "audience members" on-screen watch the events of the film take place; the film Reality is a film about a filmmaker attempting to create a suitable groan of pain for his new movie; in the climax of Keep an Eye Out, it is revealed the actors are part of a theater trope that have been performing the events of the film on stage for an audience.

His first film, Nonfilm, starring Vincent Belorgey (Kavinsky) and Sébastien Tellier, released in 2001.

Dupieux's second feature film Steak was released in France on 20 June 2007. The cast is composed of Éric Judor, Ramzy Bedia, Jonathan Lambert, Vincent Belorgey and Sebastian Akchoté (SebastiAn), with an original soundtrack composed by Dupieux himself in collaboration with Sébastien Tellier and SebastiAn. The film ended up being a box-office bomb and the only film by Dupieux that did not receive an international release. According to Dupieux, the film was marketed as a "popular comedy" by StudioCanal, leading to the audience expecting to see a comedy more similar to previous films by Éric and Ramzy, hence the reason for this flop in the theaters. Dupieux also directed the opening credit sequence for the adult animated series Moot-Moot, created by Éric and Ramzy, broadcast on Canal+ the same year.

Filming for the absurdist horror film Rubber began in 2009. The electronic music duo Justice stated that they would be working on the soundtrack for Rubber, saying they had to 'finish working on the soundtrack for Mr. Oizo's new film before we start recording for the new album'. However, only Gaspard Augé of the duo ended up collaborating with Dupieux on the soundtrack. In the United States, the film was released simultaneously through streaming and limited theatrical engagements.

The surreal comedy Wrong premiered at the Sundance Film Festival in 2012.

The comedy Wrong Cops was produced by Realitism Films, who describe it as "a filthy 90 minute comedy about some disturbed cops. It is not a sequel to Wrong." The first thirteen-minute chapter of the film premiered at the 2012 Cannes Film Festival.

Dupieux returned in 2014 with the surreal comedy Reality, starring Alain Chabat, distributed in the US by IFC Midnight. The film premiered in the Horizons section at the 71st Venice International Film Festival on 28 August 2014.

In 2018, his first film shot in France, Keep an Eye Out! (original title: Au poste!), starring Benoît Poelvoorde and Grégoire Ludig, released in theaters. The film's story involves a commissaire de police (Poelvoorde) and a suspect (Ludig) in an interrogation room. For this film, Dupieux was indirectly inspired by the film Le Magnifique, starring Jean-Paul Belmondo, and some press reviews have compared the film to Buffet froid by Bertrand Blier.

In 2019, Dupieux returned with Deerskin (original title: Le daim), starring Jean Dujardin and Adèle Haenel. The film was presented as opening film at the Directors' Fortnight at the 2019 Cannes Film Festival.

His film Mandibles (original title: Mandibules), starring David Marsais and Grégoire Ludig, the two members of the duo Palmashow, released on 19 May 2021 in French theaters. It was screened out of competition at the 77th Venice International Film Festival on 5 September 2020. Following the critical success of the film at the Venice International Film Festival, Magnolia Pictures acquired distribution rights for the United States.

His next film, entitled Incroyable mais vrai, starring Alain Chabat and Anaïs Demoustier, who respectively played in his previous films Reality and Au poste!, will be released in 2022. The cast is also composed of Léa Drucker and Benoît Magimel.

Personal life
He currently lives with his partner Joan Le Boru, who is the chief decorator and artistic director of his films. They have several children together.

Discography

Studio albums
 Analog Worms Attack (1999)
 Moustache (Half a Scissor) (2005)
 Lambs Anger (2008)
 Stade 2 (2011)
 The Church (2014)
 All Wet (2016)
 Voilà (with Phra) (2022)

Filmography

Films

Music videos 
 "Kirk" (1997)
 "Flashback" - Laurent Garnier (1997)
 "M-Seq" (1999)
 "Flat Beat" (1999)
 "Analog Worms Attack" (1999)
 "Inside The Kidney Machine" (1999)
 "Stunt" (2004)
 "La Ritournelle" - Sébastien Tellier (2004)
 "Making Lambs Anger" (2009)
 "Where's the Money, George?" (2010)
 "Being Flat" (2015) (Short film)
 "Night Owl" - Metronomy (2016)
 "Discow" - Handbraekes (2018)
 "Viandes Légumes Véhicules" - (2019, directed by Meat Dept.)

Awards and nominations
Dupieux was promoted to "Officier de l'ordre des Arts et des Lettres" on 12 March 2019 by the Ministry of Culture.

{| class=wikitable
|-
! Year !! Awards !! Work !! Category !! Result
|-
| rowspan=2|1999
| MTV Europe Music Awards
| rowspan=2|Himself
| Best Male
| 
|-
| Viva Comet Awards
| Beste Werbung (Best Advertise)
| 
|-
| 2000
| Billboard Music Video Awards
| "Flat Beat"
| Best New Artist Clip (Dance) 
| 
|-
| 2008
| Beatport Music Awards
| Himself
| Best Indie Dance / Nu Disco Artist
| 
|-
| rowspan=2|2016
| UK Music Video Awards
| "Hand in the Fire" (with Charli XCX)
| Best Animation
| 
|-
|Best Art Vinyl
|All Wet
| Best Art Vinyl
|

References

External links

 
 
 Lambs Anger Album Review
 Video footage of Making Lambs Anger by Mr Oizo
 Review of Mr. Oizo's Pourriture EP on the Daily Music Guide

1974 births
Because Music artists
Brainfeeder artists
Electronic dance music DJs
French DJs
French cinematographers
French composers
French dance musicians
French electronic musicians
French film directors
French film editors
French house musicians
French male composers
French male non-fiction writers
French male screenwriters
French record producers
French screenwriters
French songwriters
Male songwriters
French surrealist artists
Living people
Musicians from Paris
Mute Records artists